Rita Köster (born 19 December 1960) is a German handball player. She participated at the 1992 Summer Olympics, where the German national team placed fourth.

References 
 Profile at sports-reference.com

1960 births
Living people
Sportspeople from Oldenburg
German female handball players
Olympic handball players of Germany
Handball players at the 1992 Summer Olympics